Aellopos fadus, the Fadus sphinx, is a moth of the family Sphingidae.  The species was first described by Pieter Cramer in 1776.

Distribution 
It lives in Central America and the northern part of South America.

Description 
The wingspan is 57–60 mm. The body is brown with a wide white band across the abdomen. The upperside of the wing is dark brown and the forewing has two bands of pale spots and lacks a black spot at the end of the cell. The hindwing has a pale patch on the costa and one on the inner margin.

Biology 
Adults are on wing year round in the tropics. They feed on nectar from various flowers, including Abelia species.

The larvae feed on various Rubiaceae species, including Genipa americana, Alibertia edulis and Randia species. There are at least two color morphs, a green and a reddish-brown form. Pupation takes place in loose cocoons in shallow underground chambers. The pupae are dark, smooth and shiny.

References

External links

Aellopos
Moths described in 1776
Sphingidae of South America
Moths of Central America
Taxa named by Pieter Cramer